The Khulna Medical College (KMC) is a government medical school in Khulna, Bangladesh. It is affiliated with Sheikh Hasina Medical University. It is located in the city of Khulna, near the inter-district Bus Stand at the entrance to the city.

Khulna Medical College was established in 1992. The current principal is Md Abdul Ahad.

National and international recognition
This institute is recognized by BCPS (Bangladesh College of Physicians and Surgeons) for postgraduate training and it has been included in WHO directory of medical colleges. As such graduates from this college can take part in USMLE examination in the United States.

Departments
Anatomy
Anesthesiology
Blood Transfusion
Burn & Plastic Surgery
Cardiology
Cardiac Surgery
Community Medicine
Dermatology
Forensic Medicine
Gastroenterology
Gynaecology and Obstetrics
Hepatology
Medicine
Microbiology
Neurology
Neurosurgery
Ophthalmology
Oral & Maxillofacial Surgery
Orthopedics
Otorhinolaryngology
Surgery
Pathology
Pediatric Surgery
Pediatrics
Pharmacology
Psychiatry
Radiology
Radiotherapy
Respiratory Medicine
Surgery
Surgical Oncology
Urology

Campus
The academic building, adjacent to the hospital, is a four-story building which houses both administrative and academic sections: administration, students' areas, and office of the Principal. For educational purposes, there are classrooms, galleries, a library, and an audio-visual unit. There are four large galleries for combined classes and six student residences, along with quarters for staff and officers of the college and hospital.

Organization and administration
Khulna Medical College is affiliated with Sheikh Hasina Medical University , Khulna

Academics
Prospective students take an admission test conducted by the Ministry of Health. Students selected are then admitted on the basis of their choice. The students receive a MBBS degree after the completion of their fifth year and after passing the final Professional MBBS examination. This college is directly regulated by Bangladesh Medical and Dental Council, an affiliate of the Bangladesh Ministry of Health.

KMC DAY 
"KMC Day" is celebrated at Khulna Medical College on 8th July.  Note: The first admission process was started on July 8, 1992 in Khulna Medical College.

Gallery

See also
 List of medical colleges in Bangladesh

References

External links
 

Medical colleges in Bangladesh
Education in Khulna
Hospitals in Bangladesh
Educational institutions established in 1992
1992 establishments in Bangladesh
Organisations based in Khulna
Educational institutions of Khulna Division